If I Stay is a 2014 American teen romantic drama film directed by R. J. Cutler and based on the 2009 novel of the same name by Gayle Forman.

The film stars Chloë Grace Moretz, Mireille Enos, Joshua Leonard, and Stacy Keach. It was released on August 22, 2014, grossing $78.9million worldwide.

Plot 
Mia Hall and her family are getting ready to go on with their normal day activities when it is announced on the radio that school has been canceled. Mia's father, Denny, is a teacher and as a result of the snow day does not have to go to work. Mia's mother, Kat, a travel agent, decides to call in sick and along with her family and Mia's brother Teddy so they can get on the road to visit Mia's grandparents, who live on a farm.

The story flashes back to Mia's early life with a rockstar father and an inexperienced mother, when one day they take Mia to a music class where Mia decides that she wants to start playing the cello. After her parents see that Mia is passionate about the cello, they hire a teacher to help her play. Kat is shown pregnant with Teddy, whom Mia thinks is the reason for her father's departure from his band.

Years later, an adolescent Mia is still passionate about the cello and is playing at school in the band room where Adam Wilde, a popular student and up-and-coming rockstar, peeks in on her playing. This leads him to ask Kim, Mia's best friend, about her. Adam then asks Mia out on a date to a cello recital, where they kiss.

The story flashes back to the present day, where the family is driving to the grandparents' farm, before their car suddenly collides with an oncoming truck. Mia appears to have an out-of-body experience where she finds herself barefoot and sees her body lying on the road while paramedics are trying to help her and her family. Mia tries to ask a paramedic what is happening, but realizes that no one can see or hear her. Mia, now in the hospital, panics as she does not know the current status of any of her family members when they take her in for surgery. A sympathetic nurse, Nurse Ramirez, tells Mia—her physical body, not Mia's spirit, which apparently she cannot see either—that it is up to her whether or not she wants to stay.

The story flashes back once again to Mia attending one of Adam's concerts with his band Willamette Stone, where she does not seem to fit in. Adam's band is steadily gaining more recognition and gets signed to a label, which puts a strain on their relationship due to the travel schedule. While at dinner, Mia's grandpa suggests that she should apply to Juilliard, an idea which she initially rebuffs, but later further researches. She eventually lands an audition in San Francisco. It takes a while for Mia to tell Adam about her audition and when she does he becomes upset and leaves for a week-long gig.

In the present day, Mia undergoes surgery. She sees a doctor speaking with her grandparents who are standing outside of a pediatric room where Teddy lies in a coma-like state. Adam comes to the hospital to see Mia, but is not allowed in as he is not an immediate family member. It is then revealed that Kat was pronounced dead on arrival and Denny died on the operating table. She later finds out that Teddy has died from an epidural hematoma. Mia's grandfather George talks to Mia, revealing that when her father heard her playing cello one time, he decided to sacrifice his career knowing that she was talented, so quit his band, sold his drums, and bought her first cello. He also tearfully gives Mia permission to move on from this life if she wants, which influences Mia to decide that she wants to die so that she can join her family on the other side.

The story flashes back to Mia at her audition for Juilliard, where she plays the best she has ever played, leading her to think that if accepted, she would go. After a reconciliation with Adam, they talk about the huge possibility of her going to Juilliard, which ultimately leads to them breaking up and going their separate ways.

After some time, Mia seems stable enough to receive more visitors. Mia is shown symbolically about to let go when she hears the music performed at the cello recital that she attended with Adam. It is revealed that Adam has come to see Mia and that he is playing his iPod for her. He brings with him a letter Mia has received from Juilliard saying that she has been accepted and lets her know that he would do whatever she wants if she stays. He begins to play the song he has finally written about her. Mia, after flashing back through all the happy moments in her life, squeezes Adam's hand and opens her eyes. She sees Adam looking at her saying, "Mia!"

Cast 
 Chloë Grace Moretz as Mia Hall
 Jamie Blackley as Adam Wilde
 Mireille Enos as Kat Hall
 Joshua Leonard as Denny Hall
 Stacy Keach as George Hall
 Aisha Hinds as Nurse Ramirez
 Lauren Lee Smith as Willow
 Liana Liberato as Kim Schein
 Aliyah O'Brien as EMT
 Jakob Davies as Teddy Hall

Production 
In December 2010, it was announced that a film based on the novel If I Stay was in the works at Summit Entertainment and that Dakota Fanning, Chloë Grace Moretz and Emily Browning were in talks to play Mia. Catherine Hardwicke was attached to direct, but was replaced by Brazilian filmmaker Heitor Dhalia, who also left the film later. On January 24, 2013, Moretz was officially cast to play the lead and R. J. Cutler was announced as the new director of the film. Trevor Smith was brought on as associate producer. The shooting of the film began on October 30 in Vancouver.

In January 2014, Metro-Goldwyn-Mayer and Warner Bros. were announced to be distributing the film and the release was set for August 22.

Music 

The music was composed by Heitor Pereira. The soundtrack was released on August 19, 2014 by WaterTower Music. It peaked at number 54 on the Billboard 200 in the United States, and number 77 in Australia.

Vancouver-based alternative rock band Hawking appeared in the film numerous times as Willamette Stone.

All the songs for Adam Wilde's band Willamette Stone, including the cover of The Smashing Pumpkins' song "Today", were produced by indie rock producer Adam Lasus.

Reception

Box office 
As of November 20, 2014, If I Stay has grossed a worldwide total of $78,396,071 against a budget of $11million.

If I Stay opened at #3 to 2,907 locations in North America behind Guardians of the Galaxy and Teenage Mutant Ninja Turtles, which were in their fourth and third weeks respectively. On its opening day the film earned $6,827,007 earning it the top spot for the day.

Critical response 
On Rotten Tomatoes, the film has a rating of 35%, based on 142 reviews with an average score of 4.9/10. The site's critical consensus reads, "Although Chloë Grace Moretz gives it her all and the story adds an intriguing supernatural twist to its melodramatic YA framework, If I Stay is ultimately more manipulative than moving". On Metacritic, the film holds a score of 46 out of 100, based on 36 critics, indicating "mixed or average reviews".

In his review for The New York Times, A.O. Scott praised Moretz's acting. He added that the "music is both the best and the corniest part of If I Stay, which makes excellent use of the classical cello repertoire." Writing for Variety, Justin Chang criticized Moretz's acting, explaining that "she comes off as a bit too self-assured to play the nerdy misfit." Anthony Lane of The New Yorker wrote a critical review of the movie, saying, "The saddest thing about 'If I Stay' is that it affords Moretz so little opportunity to be non-sad." In the Los Angeles Times, Olivier Gettell summed up that critics saw the film was "clunky and uninspired."

Accolades

Home media 
If I Stay was released on DVD and Blu-ray on November 18, 2014 by 20th Century Fox Home Entertainment (under license from MGM).

References

External links 
 
 

2014 films
2014 romantic drama films
2010s ghost films
2010s teen drama films
2010s teen romance films
American ghost films
American romantic drama films
American teen drama films
American teen romance films
Films about death
Films about music and musicians
Films about road accidents and incidents
Films based on American novels
Films based on young adult literature
Films directed by R. J. Cutler
Films scored by Heitor Pereira
Films set in California
Films set in Portland, Oregon
Films shot in Vancouver
Metro-Goldwyn-Mayer films
New Line Cinema films
Warner Bros. films
2010s English-language films
2010s American films